The Great Gambini is a 1937 American mystery film directed by Charles Vidor and written by Frederick J. Jackson, Frank Partos and Howard Irving Young. The film stars Akim Tamiroff, Marian Marsh, John Trent, Genevieve Tobin, Reginald Denny, Roland Drew and William Demarest. The film was released on June 25, 1937, by Paramount Pictures.

Plot
Grant Naylor is unhappy because the woman he loves, Ann Randall, wants to instead marry Stephen Danby, a scoundrel. All are surprised during a performance of The Great Gambini when the magician predicts Ann and Danby will never be wed.

His prediction comes true when Danby's dead body is found. Sgt. Kirby questions all of Ann's family and Grant, and a piece of evidence points them to a man who was using a disguise. Grant believes the detective has the wrong man and discovers it's been Gambini himself all along. Gambini confesses on stage, but remains confident because Kirby's handcuffs might not be able to hold him.

Cast
Akim Tamiroff as The Great Gambini
Marian Marsh as Ann Randall
John Trent as Grant Naylor
Genevieve Tobin as Nancy Randall
Reginald Denny as William Randall
Roland Drew as Stephen Danby
William Demarest as Sergeant Kirby
Edward Brophy as Butch
Alan Birmingham as Lamb
Lya Lys as Luba
Ralph Peters as Bartender

References

External links 
 

1937 films
American mystery films
1937 mystery films
Paramount Pictures films
Films directed by Charles Vidor
Films produced by B. P. Schulberg
American black-and-white films
1930s English-language films
1930s American films